Tyrosine-protein kinase BLK, also known as B lymphocyte kinase, is a non-receptor tyrosine kinase that in humans is encoded by the BLK gene. It is of the Src family of tyrosine kinases.

Interactions
The tyrosine-protein kinase BLK has been shown to interact with UBE3A.

References

Further reading

Tyrosine kinases